Hijo de ladrón is a Chilean novel, written by Manuel Rojas. It was first published in 1951.

It was translated by Frank Gaynor and published under the title Born Guilty by Library Publishers in New York in 1955 and by Gollancz in London in 1956. The translation has been described as skilful.

References

Further reading 

Berta López Morales. Hijo de ladrón: novela de aprendizaje antiburguesa. Editorial La Noria. 1987. Google Books
Norman Cortés Larrieu. "Hijo de ladrón de Manuel Rojas: Tres formas de inconexión en el relato". Estudios de lengua y literatura como humanidades: Homenaje a Juan Uribe Echeverría. Editorial Universitaria. Santiago. 1960. Page 105. Google Books
Norman Cortés Larrieu, "Hijo de ladrón de Manuel Rojas: Tres formas de inconexión en el relato", Anales de la Universidad de Chile, CXIII, number 120, pages 193 to 202, Google Books
Luis E Carcamo-Huechante. "Rojas, Manuel". Daniel Balderston and Mike Gonzalez (eds). Encyclopedia of Twentieth-Century Latin American and Caribbean Literature 1900-2003. Routledge. 2004. Page 504. See also page 135.
"Spanish Reviews" (2002) World Literature Today, volume 76, issues 1-4, page 219 Google Books
Angel Flores. Spanish American Authors: The Twentieth Century. Wilson. 1992. Page 751. Google Books
Books and Bookmen, volumes 1-2, Google Books
Myron I Lichtblau, "Ironic Devices in Manuel Rojas' Hijo de ladrón" (Fall 1965) Symposium, pages 214 to 225
Carla Cordua. Nativos de este mundo. Editorial Universitaria. 2004. Page 73 et seq.
Mauro Armiño. "Hijo De Ladrón". Parnaso: Diccionario Sopena de Literatura. R Sopena. 1988. Page 1917. Google Books
Raymond Leslie Williams. The Columbia Guide to the Latin American Novel Since 1945. Columbia University Press. New York. 2007. Page 57.
Mario Bahamonde, "Hijo de ladrón de Manuel Rojas", El Mercurio de Antofagasta, 23 September 1951 (Antofagasta, Chile)
Iván Robledo. "Hijo de ladrón, de Manuel Rojas", La Opinión, 21 September 1951 (Santiago, Chile)
Emir Rodríguez Monegal, "Una gran novela americana", Marcha, 4 November 1955 (Montevideo)
Edmundo Concha, "Entrevista a Manuel Rojas, autor de Hijo de ladrón", Eva, 26 October 1951 (Santiago, Chile)
Ovidio Omar Amaya, "Manuel Rojas, Hijo de ladrón" (1952) 26 Books Abroad 385
Edmundo Concha, "Hijo de ladrón, novela de Manuel Rojas", (January and February 1953)  Atenea, volume 109, Numbers 331 and 332, pages 149 to 153 (Concepción, Chile)
Fernando Uriarte, "Hijo de ladrón, novela de Manuel Rojas", El Diario Ilustrado, 23 September 1951 (Santiago, Chile)
Milton Rossel, "Hijo de ladrón, por Manuel Rojas" (March 1952) Occidente, number 75 (Santiago, Chile)
Ricardo Latcham, "Hijo de ladrón, por Manuel Rojas", La Nación, 21 October 1951 (Santiago, Chile)
Luis Merino Reyes, "Hijo de ladrón, de Manuel Rojas", Las Últimas Noticias, 4 October 1951 (Santiago, Chile)

Spanish-language novels
1951 Chilean novels